Fran Sánchez (born 27 October 1977) is a Spanish football manager. He managed FC Barcelona Femení. He took over the position in June 2017, replacing Xavi Llorens. His contract with the club was terminated in January 2019, after managing the club for a year and a half. He was replaced by Lluís Cortés.

Honours
Catalan Super Cup: 2017
Copa de la Reina: 2018

References

1977 births
Living people
Spanish football managers
FC Barcelona Femení managers
Primera División (women) managers